Hope is an acoustic album from Atlanta-based indie rock band Manchester Orchestra. It was released on September 16, 2014 as a digital download through Loma Vista Recordings and the band's own independent label, Favorite Gentlemen. Hope serves as a companion piece to the band's fourth album Cope, with each track being an acoustic re-imagining of a song from Cope.

Critical reception

Hope generally received a positive reception upon release. Many reviewers, such as Lucy Hovanisyan at 34th Street Magazine, commented on Manchester Orchestra's "masterful" reworking of Cope into an acoustic work.

In a four-star review for AllMusic, Matt Collar mentioned that, "Hope works in perfect counterpoint to its darker, harsher predecessor. And certainly, while Hull has a knack for crafting blistering emo-epics, at the core of many of his songs there is a melodic lyricism and tender emotionality that lends itself to just the kind of delicate treatment achieved on Hope."

Track listing

References

2014 albums
Manchester Orchestra albums
Loma Vista Recordings albums